The governorates of Libya (muhafazah) were a tenfold top-level administrative division of Libya from 1963 until 1983.

They came into being on 27 April 1963. In 1970, after the 1 September 1969 Free Officers Movement coup, there was an administrative reorganization which gave local authorities more power to implement policies of the national government, and redesignated some of the names and boundaries of the ten governorates. In February 1975, Libya issued a law that abolished the governorates and their service directorates, however they continued to operate until they were fully replaced in 1983 by the baladiyat system districts.

Historically, the three provinces of Libya (Tripolitania in the northwest, Cyrenaica in the east, and Fezzan in the southwest) were sometimes called governorates.

Ten governorates

The original ten governorates were:
 Bayda Governorate   In 1971 Bayda was renamed Jabal al Akhdar.
 Al Khums Governorate
 Awbari Governorate
 Az Zawiyah Governorate
 Benghazi Governorate
 Darnah Governorate
 Al Jabal al Gharbi Governorate   In 1970 Al Jabal al Gharbi was renamed Gharyan.
 Misrata Governorate
 Sabha Governorate
 Tarabulus Governorate.

Reorganisation under Gaddafi

As early as 1973, Libya had been divided into forty-six baladiyat for census purposes. In 1983 Libya replaced the governorates structure with the district (baladiyah) one, creating forty-six districts.

See also
Districts of Libya
Provinces of Libya

Notes

External links
Map of the ten governorates of Libya, Area Handbook for Libya, United States Library of Congress

 
Libya
Former subdivisions of Libya